"Cindy Incidentally" is a song by the British group Faces, written by group members Rod Stewart, Ronnie Wood and Ian McLagan. It was produced by Glyn Johns. It was included on the band's 1973 album Ooh La La, and in the same year was released by Warner Bros. Records as the first single from that album.

It was the group's biggest hit in the UK, reaching number two on the UK chart in 1973 and staying on the chart for nine weeks. AllMusic describes the song as "one of their best". The song also was a moderate hit in the US on the Hot 100.

Personnel
 Ronnie Lane – bass, rhythm guitar
 Ian McLagan – piano
 Kenney Jones – drums
 Rod Stewart – vocals
 Ronnie Wood – lead guitar

Charts

References 

1973 songs
Songs written by Rod Stewart
Songs written by Ronnie Wood
1973 singles
Faces (band) songs
Song recordings produced by Glyn Johns
Warner Records singles
Songs written by Ian McLagan